The Dublin Unified School District (DUSD) serves over 12,900 students, from preschool through adult education, in a diverse suburban environment. The district operates seven elementary schools, two middle schools, one K-8 school, one continuation high school, and one comprehensive high school. Dublin is a suburban city in the East (San Francisco) Bay Area and Tri-Valley regions of Alameda County, California. The city, with a population of approximately 65,716, is located along the north side of the Interstate 580/680 intersection. As of 2018, the graduation rate was 98%.

Board of Trustees
 Dan Cherrier, President
 Kristin Pelham, Vice President
 Megan Rouse, Trustee
 Gabi Blackman,Trustee
 William Kuo, Trustee (widower of former Board Member Catherine Kuo)
 Katherine Cheng, Student Representative, Dublin High School

Superintendent and cabinet

 Chris Funk, Superintendent
 Vicki Bustos, Assistant Superintendent, Administrative Assistance. 
 Heather Duncan, Assistant Superintendent, Human Resources
 Chris Hobbs, Assistant Superintendent, Business Services
 Dr. Matt Campbell, Assistant Superintendent, Educational Services
 Thomas Moore, Assistant Superintendent, Facilities, Planning, & Construction

Dublin Partners in Education (DPIE) is the non-profit educational foundation for the Dublin Unified School District and was founded in 1992.

Dublin schools
A second comprehensive high school is currently under construction and planned to open during the Fall of 2022. The name "Emerald High School" was unanimously chosen as the name of the school by the DUSD Board on August 18, 2020.

High schools
 Dublin High School
 Valley High School (Continuation school)
 Emerald High School (To be finished in late Fall 2023)

Middle schools
 Eleanor Murray Fallon Middle School
 Wells Middle School

K-8 school
 Cotton Wood Creek School

Elementary schools
 Amador Elementary School
 James Dougherty Elementary School
 Dublin Elementary School
 Frederiksen Elementary School
 John Green Elementary School
 Kolb Elementary School
 Murray Elementary School

References

External links
 

School districts in Alameda County, California
Dublin, California